The following is a timeline of the history of the city of Taranto in the Apulia region of Italy.

Prior to 20th century

 8th C. BCE - "Greeks from Sparta and Laconia took ancient Taras from the Massepicans."
 212 BCE - Battle of Tarentum (212 BC) fought during the Second Punic War.
 209 BCE - Battle of Tarentum (209 BC).
 465 CE - Roman Catholic diocese of Taranto active (approximate date).
 840 CE - Taranto occupied by Muslims (approximate date).
 927 - Taranto sacked by Saracens.
 967 - Nikephoros II Phokas "rebuilds the town".
 11th C. - Taranto Cathedral
 1063 - Taranto taken by forces of Norman Robert Guiscard.
 1088 - Bohemond I of Antioch becomes Prince of Taranto.
 1301 - Philip I, Prince of Taranto becomes Prince of Taranto.
 1496 - Castello Aragonese (Taranto) present fortress built.
 1656 - Plague.
 1770 -  built.
 1861 - Population: 27,484.
 1864 - Naval Commission designate it as third maritime arsenal.
 1868 - Taranto railway station opens.
 1869 - Jonica railway begins operating.
 1881 - Population: 33,942.
 1883 
  (bridge) built.
 Work begins on the maritime arsenal.
 1886 - Taranto–Brindisi railway begins operating.
 1887 -  (bridge) built.
 1889 -  built.
 1896 -  built.

20th century

 1901 - Population: 50,592.
 1911 -  formed.
 1914 - Cantieri navali Tosi di Taranto (shipyard) begins operating.
 1921 - Population: 103,807.
 1922 -  begins operating.
 1923 -  (racetrack) opens.
 1927 - Taranto F.C. 1927 formed.
 1936 - Population: 127,230.
 1940 - Battle of Taranto fought during World War II.
 1947 -  newspaper begins publication.
 1960s -  steelworks "IV Centro" in business in Taranto (approximate date).
 1965 - Stadio Erasmo Iacovone (stadium) opens.
 1977 - Ponte Punta Penna Pizzone (bridge) opens.
 1979 -  newspaper begins publication.

21st century

 2007 -  held; Ippazio Stefano becomes mayor.
 2013 - Population: 198,728.

See also
 History of Taranto
 List of mayors of Taranto (in Italian)
 List of bishops of Taranto
  region

Other cities in the macroregion of South Italy:(it)
 Timeline of Bari, Apulia region
 Timeline of Brindisi, Apulia
 Timeline of L'Aquila, Abruzzo region
 Timeline of Naples, Campania region
 Timeline of Reggio Calabria
 Timeline of Salerno, Campania

ReferencesThis article incorporates information from the Italian Wikipedia.''

Bibliography

in English

in Italian

 
 
 
  (bibliography)
  (includes Taranto)
  circa 1900?

External links

 Archivio di Stato di Taranto (state archives)
 Items related to Taranto, various dates (via Europeana)
 Items related to Taranto, various dates (via Digital Public Library of America)

History of Taranto
Taranto